Gorgani or Gurgani is the extinct language of the city of Gorgan in northern Iran, neighboring Mazanderani. It is documented from the 14th and 15th centuries, from the writings of the Horufi movement.

References

Northwestern Iranian languages
Caspian languages